Count Carl August Ehrensvärd (5 May 1745 – 21 May 1800) was a Swedish naval officer, painter, author, and neo-classical architect.

Ehrensvärd  was born in Stockholm, and died in Örebro. Though active as a naval officer during his entire life, he is mostly remembered for the burlesque caricatures of often famous people from his era with which he decorated his letters. Some of his writings were published by Svenska Vitterhetssamfundet.

In 1790, he was elected a member of the Royal Swedish Academy of Sciences.

See also 
 Johan Tobias Sergel
 Carl Michael Bellman

References

External links 

 

Swedish architects
Swedish male writers
Swedish nobility
Swedish admirals
Members of the Royal Swedish Academy of Sciences
1745 births
1800 deaths
18th-century Swedish people